Robert Reitsch (January 11, 1906 – September 4, 1998) was an American college football player. A prominent center, he was the captain of the national champion 1927 Illinois Fighting Illini football team, chosen first-team All-American by some selectors. Reitsch was a native of Rockford.

He was later secretary of the alumni association.

References

External links
 

1906 births
1998 deaths
American football centers
Illinois Fighting Illini football players
All-American college football players
People from Rockford, Illinois
Players of American football from Illinois